The Korean Astronomical Society is a non-profit learned society in South Korea that aims a supporting astronomical scholarship, technological development, education, and the spread of astronomical knowledge. It operates the Journal of the Korean Astronomical Society.

The KAS was founded on 21 March 1965, and presently has over 700 members. It holds meetings in spring and autumn of each year. The KAS is a member organisation of the International Astronomical Union, which it joined in 1973, and hosted the IAU Asia-Pacific Regional Meeting in 1996 and 2014. It also co-hosted the International Astronomy Olympiad in 2012.

References 

Astronomy societies
1965 establishments in Korea
Scientific organizations established in 1965
Scientific organizations based in South Korea